Romano Zolin (born 7 November 1935) is an Italian former footballer who played in the 1950s as a forward.

Zolin joined FC Basel's first team in their 1953–54 season under player-coach René Bader. After playing in two test matches in his first season with the club, Frey made his domestic league debut on 14 November 1954 as Basel won 3–2 away to Lugano. He scored his first goal for the club a week later on 21 November in a 2–0 home win at the Landhof against Fribourg.

Between 1954 and 1958 Zolin played sixteen games for Basel scoring twice. Five of these games were in the Nationalliga A, one in the Swiss Cup and ten were friendly games. He scored both his goals in the domestic league.

References

Sources
 Die ersten 125 Jahre. Publisher: Josef Zindel im Friedrich Reinhardt Verlag, Basel. 
 Verein "Basler Fussballarchiv" Homepage

FC Basel players
Italian footballers
Association football forwards
1935 births
Living people